The 1935 Gonzaga Bulldogs football team was an American football team that represented Gonzaga University during the 1935 college football season. In their fifth year under head coach Mike Pecarovich, the Bulldogs compiled a 5–4–1 record and outscored all opponents by a total of 125 to 109.

Fullback George Karamatic and halfback Ed Justice played for Gonzaga in 1935. Both later played years in the National Football League for the Washington Redskins and were inducted into the Gonzaga Athletic Hall of Fame.

Schedule

References

Gonzaga
Gonzaga Bulldogs football seasons
Gonzaga Bulldogs football